Sergio Marinangeli (born 2 July 1980 in Gualdo Tadino) is an Italian road bicycle racer. He turned professional in 2003.

References
 

1980 births
Living people
People from Gualdo Tadino
Italian male cyclists
Cyclists from Umbria
Sportspeople from the Province of Perugia